Administrative division, administrative unit, country subdivision, administrative region, subnational entity, constituent state, as well as many similar terms, are generic names for geographical areas into which a particular, independent sovereign state (country) is divided. Such a unit usually has an administrative authority with the power to take administrative or policy decisions for its area. 

Usually, countries have several levels of administrative divisions. The common names for the principal (largest) administrative divisions are: states (i.e. "subnational states", rather than sovereign states), provinces, lands, oblasts, governorates, cantons, prefectures, counties, regions, departments, and emirates. These, in turn, are often subdivided into smaller administrative units known by names such as circuits, counties, comarcas, raions, județe, or districts, which are further subdivided into municipalities, communes or communities constituting the smallest units of subdivision (the local governments).

The exact number of the levels of administrative divisions and their structure largely varies by country (and sometimes within a single country). Usually, the smaller the country is (by area or population), the fewer levels of administrative divisions it has. For example, the Vatican does not have any administrative subdivisions and Monaco has only one level, while such countries as France and Pakistan have five levels each. The United States is composed of states, possessions, territories, and a federal district, each with varying numbers of subdivisions.

The principal administrative division of a country might be called the "first-level (or first-order) administrative division" or "first administrative level". Its next subdivision might be called "second-level administrative division" or "second administrative level" and so on.

Administrative divisions are conceptually separate from dependent territories, with the former being an integral part of the state and the other being only under some lesser form of control. However, the term "administrative division" can include dependent territories as well as accepted administrative divisions (for example, in geographical databases).

Communities united in a federation under a federal government are more specifically known as federated states. A federated state may be referred to not only as a state, but also as a province, a region, a canton, a land, a governorate, an oblast, an emirate or a country.

Administrative units that are not federated or confederated but enjoy a greater degree of autonomy or self-government than other territories within the same country can be considered constituent states of that country. This relationship is by some authors called a federacy. An example is the autonomous republic of Karakalpakstan within Uzbekistan.

Examples of administrative divisions

English terms 

In many of the following terms originating from British cultural influence, areas of relatively low mean population density might bear a title of an entity one would expect to be either larger or smaller. There is no fixed rule, for "all politics is local" as is perhaps well demonstrated by their relative lack of systemic order. In the realm of self-government, any of these can and does occur along a stretch of road—which for the most part is passing through rural, unsettled countryside. Since the terms are administrative political divisions of the local regional government, their exact relationship and definitions are subject to home rule considerations, tradition, as well as state statute law and local governmental (administrative) definition and control. In British cultural legacy, some territorial entities began with fairly expansive counties which encompass an appreciably large area, but were divided over time into a number of smaller entities.
Within those entities are the large and small cities or towns, which may or may not be the county seat. Some of the world's larger cities culturally, if not officially, span several counties, and those crossing state or provincial boundaries have much in common culturally as well, but are rarely incorporated within the same municipal government. Many sister cities share a water boundary, which quite often serves as a border of both cities and counties. For example, Cambridge and Boston, Massachusetts appear to the casual traveler as one large city, while locally they each are quite culturally different and occupy different counties.

List 

Area
Autonomous community
Banner
Barangay
Barony
Capital city
Canton
County
Community
Constituency
Crown Dependency
Department
District
Division
Duchy
Governorate
 Legal entity
Hundred
Federal subjects
Kingdom
Local council
Municipality
Regional
Regional county
Rural
Oblast
Parish
Prefecture
Principality
Province
Public body
Region
Republic
Riding
State
Special administrative region
Territory
Theme
Voivodeship

Urban or rural regions 
General terms for these incorporated places include "municipality," "settlement," "locality," and "populated place."
Borough, burgh or "boro"
City
Shire
Town
Township
Village

Indigenous 
Tribe
Indian reservation
Indian reserve
Band
Ranchería

Non-English terms 

Due to variations in their use worldwide, consistency in the translation of terms from non-English to English is sometimes difficult to maintain.

See also 
GADM, a high-resolution database of country administrative areas.
ISO 3166-2, specifically Codes for the representation of names of countries and their subdivisions — Part 2.
List of administrative division name changes
List of etymologies of country subdivision names
List of administrative divisions by country

References

External links 

SALB Second Administrative Level Boundaries (SALB) programme of the United Nations.
Statoids, an international convention with standardized two-letter-based multi-level summaries of administrative divisions worldwide (e.g. GH.AH.AS represents Adansi South (AE) in the Accra Home (AH) region of Ghana (GH)).

 
 
Types of geographical division